Terrified is a 2017 Argentine horror film written and directed by Demián Rugna, concerning a series of supernatural events in a neighbourhood of Buenos Aires.

Plot

At home in Buenos Aires, Clara hears strange voices coming from the plughole in her kitchen sink. The voices seem to be discussing a plan to kill her. That night, awakened by thumping sounds, Juan is terrified to find Clara's dead body hovering in midair in their bathroom, repeatedly slamming against the wall as if thrown by an invisible force.

Walter, who lives next door, is also experiencing supernatural occurrences. Each night, as he tries to sleep, invisible forces shake and move his furniture, including his bed. When he uses a video camera to film the events, he sees a tall, naked figure emerging from beneath the bed, standing over him as he sleeps, and hiding in the wardrobe.

Across the road, Alicia is grieving the death of her young son, hit by a bus outside Walter's house. Alicia's ex-boyfriend, police commissioner Funes calls Jano, a paranormal investigator and former coroner. Jano 'sees' the dead boy sitting at the kitchen table, having apparently returned from the cemetery, leaving behind a trail of muddy footprints. After deliberating, the two eventually move the now inanimate corpse to an outside freezer.

Nearby, Jano meets Dr. Mora Albreck, another paranormal investigator. Mora has arrived to meet Walter, after viewing the video recordings he sent her. However, he has gone missing, leaving his house empty. Together with Rosentock, another supernatural researcher, Jano and Albreck visit Juan, now the main suspect in his wife's murder and held in a psychiatric facility. After being assured they believe his story, Juan allows them to investigate his house.

The specialists return to the troubled street, before separating to investigate one property each. Funes accompanies Rosenstock, who is based at Walter's house. As weird phenomena occur and the investigators begin to die in gruesome and inexplicable ways, Funes realizes he has no choice but to flee the scene or risk losing his own life.

Back at the psychiatric facility, the police attempt to further question Juan but he is distracted by the figure of a tall man behind them, a man who resembles a burned Rosentock. They turn around, seeing nothing except for an empty chair. Suddenly, the chair flies towards the camera.

Cast

Maximiliano Ghione as Commissioner Funes
Norberto Gonzalo as Jano
Elvira Onetto as Dr. Mora Albreck
George L. Lewis as Rosentock 
Julieta Vallina as Alicia
Demián Salomón	as Walter
Agustín Rittano as Juan
Natalia Señorales as Clara
Matias Rascovschi as the boy
Lorenzo Langer	as Patricio

Release

Terrified was first screened at the Mórbido Fest 2017 in Mexico, followed by an international premiere at the 33rd Mar del Plata International Film Festival. The film received a general release in Argentina on 3 May 2018, opening on a smaller-than-average number of screens (80) but coming seventh at the box office on its opening weekend.

In the United States, Canada and the UK, Terrified was made available for home viewing via the streaming service Shudder.

Reception

On the review aggregator website Rotten Tomatoes Terrified holds a "77% fresh" rating, based on 13 reviews, representing a positive response from critics. Vulture.com placed it among its "Best Horror Movies of 2018 (So Far)", writing: "Terrified won best horror feature at this year’s Fantastic Fest, and is an absolutely excellent tale of the supernatural featuring some amazing deaths and creature effects. Fans of Insidious and The Conjuring should be big fans of this one, too." Kim Newman called it "[e]ffectively spooky stuff" after viewing it at the London FrightFest Film Festival in 2018.

Future
In December 2018, it was reported that Guillermo del Toro intends to produce a remake of the film for Searchlight Pictures.

During the COVID-19 pandemic lockdowns, writer-director Demián Rugna revealed he was working on the second draft of a script for a sequel, Terrified 2.

References

External links
 
 
 Official Trailer on YouTube

Argentine horror films
2017 horror films
2017 films
2010s Argentine films